Gavrilo Dožić (17 May 1881 – 7 May 1950), also known as Gavrilo V, was the Metropolitan of Montenegro and the Littoral (1920–1938) and the 41st Serbian Patriarch of the Serbian Orthodox Church, from 1938 to 1950.

Early life
Đorđe Dožić (Ђорђе Дожић) was born on 17 May 1881 in Vrujci, Kolašin, Lower Morača, Montenegro, near Morača Monastery. His family belonged to the Medenica brotherhood. He finished primary school at the monastery, as a pupil of his paternal uncle, archimandrite Mihailo. He went to theological schools in Prizren (Seminary of Prizren) and the Prince Islands (Halki seminary). After that, he finished the theological faculty in Athens (University of Athens). He worked as the secretary of the monastery of Hilandar.

Bishop
After bishop Nićifor Perić of Raška-Prizren withdrew from his office (1911), due to disagreement with the Serbian diplomacy, the Patriarchate of Constantinople appointed Gavrilo as successor, as the Serbian diplomacy wanted. There was a conflict within the Serbian Church regarding the appointment of Gavrilo; the "Old Serbs" (clergy from Kosovo and Macedonia) wanted their candidate, the previous secretary of the Eparchy of Skoplje, monk Vasilije (Bogdan) Radenković. While waiting for the Ottoman government approval, the Serbian government changed the decision and ordered through the consuls that Ottoman Serbs request that Radenković be appointed instead. However, Gavrilo ended up being chosen. Meanwhile, Radenković became a founder of the Black Hand conspiracy group.

Metropolitan
After the death of Mitrofan Ban, the Metropolitan of Montenegro and the Littoral, in 1920, Gavrilo was picked as the new Metropolitan of Montenegro and the Littoral on 17 November 1920. He stayed in this position until he was chosen to become the 51st Serbian Patriarch on 21 February 1938.

Patriarch
During World War II Patriarch Gavrilo and Bishop Nikolaj Velimirović were incarcerated at Dachau. After the Allied victory and the liberation of concentration camps, both Patriarch Gavrilo and Bishop Nikolaj went to England to live. But after a short stay, Patriarch Gavrilo decided to return home to die.

Detention and imprisonment in World War II
During World War II in 1941, as soon as the German forces occupied Yugoslavia, Patriarch Gavrilo was arrested by the Nazis who were looting the gold from the Ostrog Monastery. Ruth Mitchell in her book "The Serbs Choose War", wrote "They took from the old man everything, even his shoes. They left him naked except for his shirt. and over rough roads, over the mountains and through the deep valleys, they made him walk, at the point of a bayonet, two hundred miles, hatless in the burning Balkan sun." He later was confined in the Monastery of Ljubostinja. Later he was transferred to the Monastery of Vojlovica (near Pančevo) in which he was confined together with Bishop Nikolaj Velimirović until the end of 1944.
 
On 15 September 1944 both Serbian Patriarch Gavrilo V (Dožić) and Bishop Nikolaj Velimirović were sent to Dachau, which was at that time the main concentration camp for priests arrested by the Nazis. Both Dožić and Velimirović were held as special prisoners (Ehrenhäftlinge) imprisoned in the so-called Ehrenbunker (or Prominentenbunker) separated from the work camp area, together with high-ranking Nazi enemy officers and other prominent prisoners whose arrest has been dictated by Hitler directly.[2] In December 1944 they were transferred from Dachau to Slovenia, together with Milan Nedić, the Serbian collaborationist PM, and German general Hermann Neubacher, the first Nazi mayor of Vienna (1938–1939), as the Nazis attempted to make use of Patriarch Gavrilo's and Nikolaj's authority among the Serbs in order to gain allies in the anti-Communist movements. Contrary to claims of torture and abuse at the camp, Patriarch Dožić testified himself that both he and Velimirović were treated normally by the guards. The statement "treated normally", if made by Patriarch Gavrilo (Dozić), was made at the time when Nazi Germany still held sway in Yugoslavia.  
 
Later, Patriarch Dožić and Bishop Nikolaj were moved to Austria, and were finally liberated by the US 36th Infantry Division in Tyrol in 1945.

Last years
He was physically weakened by these vicissitudes and grew to look very old and frail. Soon after, he was taken to England. Both Dožić and Velimirović were at Westminster Abbey at the baptism of King Peter II of Yugoslavia's son and heir, Crown Prince Alexander of Yugoslavia. Velimirović preached a very moving sermon at the Serbian Orthodox chapel in the house in Egerton Gardens. But there was no place for him in England such as there had been during the First World War. Patriarch Gavrilo, being old and ill, returned to what then came to be known as the Socialist Federal Republic of Yugoslavia, while Bishop Nikolaj opted to emigrate to the United States.

Patriarch Gavrilo died on 7 May 1950, aged 68, in Belgrade, Serbia and was buried in the Cathedral Church.

He was awarded Order of Saint Sava, Order of Prince Danilo I and a number of other decorations.

See also 
 List of 20th-century religious leaders

References

Sources
 
 
 
 

1881 births
1950 deaths
People from Kolašin
Serbs of Montenegro
Gavrilo V
Bishops of Raška-Prizren
Bishops of Montenegro and the Littoral
People of the Principality of Montenegro
20th-century Eastern Orthodox bishops
Dachau concentration camp survivors
Burials at St. Michael's Cathedral (Belgrade)